The 2022 New Mexico Bowl was a college football bowl game played on December 17, 2022, at University Stadium in Albuquerque, New Mexico. The 17th annual New Mexico Bowl, the game featured the SMU Mustangs from the American Athletic Conference (The American) and the BYU Cougars, an FBS independent. The game began at 5:37 p.m. MST and aired on ABC; this time was switched with that of the Las Vegas Bowl due to an NFL scheduling decision. It was one of the 2022–23 bowl games concluding the 2022 FBS football season.

Both teams entered the game with momentum, as SMU concluded the regular season having won four of their final five games, and BYU finished with three consecutive victories of their own. Both teams entered with identical records, with seven wins and five losses. Both teams were missing several players due to injuries, draft opt-outs, and the NCAA transfer portal; these included SMU wide receiver Rashee Rice, who was nursing a toe injury and decided to begin draft preparations, and BYU linebacker Keenan Pili, who entered the transfer portal after the Cougars' regular season concluded.

Teams
The game will feature the SMU Mustangs from the American Athletic Conference and the FBS independent BYU Cougars. This will be the fourth meeting between BYU and SMU; the Cougars have won all three previous meetings. The teams first met in the 1980 Holiday Bowl and thereafter met in  1996 and 1997 as members of the Western Athletic Conference.

The game will be BYU's 40th bowl game appearance; they will enter with an all-time bowl record of 16–22–1, dating back to the 1974 Fiesta Bowl. They have one prior New Mexico Bowl appearance, as they defeated UTEP in the game's 2010 edition by a score of 52–24. SMU will make their 18th bowl game appearance, with a prior record of 7–9–1 dating back to the 1925 Dixie Classic. This game will be their first appearance in the New Mexico Bowl.

SMU

The Mustangs, representing the American Athletic Conference, began Rhett Lashlee's first season as head coach with a rivalry game matchup at North Texas, which they won convincingly, 48–10. Their home opener was against FCS Lamar, which also resulted in a solid win for the Mustangs. Their final two non-conference games came against Power Five teams, with a road game at Maryland and a home game against TCU, both of which ended in losses for SMU. They opened AAC conference play with a Wednesday night away game at UCF, delayed from the prior Saturday by Hurricane Ian. The Mustangs fell to the Knights after allowing 31 unanswered points but recovered the next week for a home win against Navy to win the Gansz Trophy. SMU dropped their homecoming game the next week to Cincinnati by a margin of two points, but again rebounded well, with three straight conference victories to put them at 6–4 and eligible for a bowl game. The first was a road contest at Tulsa, followed by a record-breaking game against Houston which SMU won, 77–63. Their sixth win of the season and third in a row was an away game against South Florida. The Mustangs' final two games resulted in one loss and one win: the loss came first, at No. 21 Tulane by five touchdowns, and a three-point win against Memphis concluded the regular season. SMU accepted their bowl bid on December 4 and will enter the game with an overall record of 7–5 with a conference mark of 5–3.

The Mustangs will be without wide receiver Rashee Rice and offensive lineman Jaylon Thomas, who are out with toe and shoulder injuries, respectively, and began NFL Draft preparations following the conclusion of the regular season.

BYU

The seventh season of the Kalani Sitake era at BYU began with a road matchup across the country, as the No. 25 Cougars traveled to face South Florida, and won by 29 points. They vaulted into the top 15 following an double overtime upset win over No. 9 Baylor in their home opener, but fell the following week in a road game at No. 25 Oregon by three touchdowns. They finished September with a pair of home contests against Mountain West Conference opponents, as the Cougars topped Wyoming by 13 points before taking down rivals Utah State by 12 points. Ranked sixteenth, BYU's next game was a neutral-site contest played at Allegiant Stadium against Notre Dame as part of their Shamrock Series, which BYU lost by eight points. This marked the start of a four-game losing streak for BYU as the Cougars dropped each of their next three games. First was their homecoming game against Arkansas, followed by a road game at Liberty, and finally a home game against East Carolina. Now 4–5, the Cougars turned the tides and finished the regular season with three consecutive victories, first against Boise State on the road by a field goal. After a bye week, the Cougars defeated FCS Utah Tech before rounding out their regular season with a nine-point win over Stanford. The Cougars accepted their bowl bid on December 4, and will enter the game with a 7–5 record.

This will be BYU's final game as an FBS independent, as the Cougars are set to join the Big 12 Conference in 2023.

After suffering an ankle injury against Stanford, quarterback Jaren Hall had limited participation in practices leading up to the game but his participation in the bowl has not been ruled out. The Cougars will be without linebacker Keenan Pili, who entered the NCAA transfer portal prior to the game, in addition to other players.

Game summary
The game was originally scheduled for 12:30 p.m. MST on ESPN, but was moved back to allow the Las Vegas Bowl to begin at an earlier time. This was done because the NFL flexed the New England Patriots–Las Vegas Raiders game out of NBC Sunday Night Football, meaning the Raiders would have had less time to prepare Allegiant Stadium, which also hosts the Las Vegas Bowl, before their game the following afternoon. The game's new time  and network was originally scheduled for the Las Vegas Bowl, and vice versa.

The game was officiated by a crew from the Sun Belt Conference, led by referee Ted Pitts and umpire Trenton Crawford.

Statistics

References

New Mexico Bowl
New Mexico Bowl
New Mexico Bowl
New Mexico Bowl
SMU Mustangs football bowl games
BYU Cougars football bowl games